"A Touch of Brimstone" is the twenty-first episode of the fourth series of the 1960s British spy television series The Avengers, starring Patrick Macnee as John Steed and Diana Rigg as Emma Peel. It was filmed  December 1965, and was first broadcast on British television on 15 February 1966. The episode was directed by James Hill and written by Brian Clemens. The plot involves Steed and Peel infiltrating the Hellfire Club (which replicates the historic Hellfire Club) whilst investigating harmful pranks on high profile political and business figures.

The episode contained visual reference to sado-masochistic pornography, and featured Rigg wearing a kinky "Queen of Sin" costume, which she designed herself. Consequently, it was not shown on American television; a scene where Peter Wyngarde's character The Honorable John Cleverly Cartney attempting to whip Peel was cut down for some UK screenings. "A Touch of Brimstone" was the most watched episode of The Avengers on its original showing.

Plot 
Steed and Peel are investigating Cartney, who is suspected of involvement in pranks on high profile political and business figures. Through subterfuge, Peel connects with Cartney, who is attracted to her. She overhears Darcy arriving and informing Cartney that he has arranged another prank. Steed infiltrates Darcy's residence and, after knocking out Cartney's housekeeper, Horace, finds a pair of rubber scissors. Real scissors are used on an electrified ribbon by an official opening the "International Friendship Club", killing him.

Darcy did not expect to be involved in murder and is distraught. Steed gets him drunk and, under the pretence of knowing him from a party, learns of the Hellfire Club, which is responsible for the pranks. Peel visits Cartney and discovers information that leads to the Club, an organization that engages in orgiastic rituals and which revels in "ultimate sins", replicating the historic Hellfire Club.

During a Club party, Darcy arrives and demands a meeting with the superiors on the "circle of justice", asking why they plotted a murder and implicated him. The centre of the circle opens as a trapdoor and Darcy is killed. On Peel's recommendation, Steed applies to join the Hellfire Club and is given two membership tests; firstly drinking a large amount of alcohol (which he does easily) and then removing a pea guarded by an axe-wielding member. Rather than trying to grab the pea, like another member who lost two fingers, Steed blows the pea away as the axe falls. Steed is welcomed by the group and overhears that the Club is planning a coup which will have the "whole country up in arms". The following day, Steed and Peel attend the next event, and spot a cache of explosives. Steed questions a drunk girl and deduces that the Club intend to blow up Culverston House, where three foreign leaders are staying. Peel re-enters in a "Queen of Sin" outfit, holding a snake. Cartney tells the group "She's yours to do with as you will". Members carry Peel, throwing rose petals on her. As the revellers watch a fight, Horace recognizes Steed and exposes him as a spy. Steed wins the ensuing sword duel against the club expert. Peel defeats two members laying out explosives underground, before being attacked with a whip by Cartney, who drops to his death through the trapdoor when his whip catches the switch.

Cast and crew
The cast for the episode were:

Patrick Macnee as John Steed
Diana Rigg as Emma Peel
Peter Wyngarde as The Honorable John Cleverly Cartney
Colin Jeavons as Lord Darcy
Carol Cleveland as Sara
Robert Cawdron as Horace
Jeremy Young as Willy Frant
Michael Latimer as Roger Winthrop
Bill Wallis as Tubby Bunn
Steve Plytas as Kartovski
Art Thomas as Pierre
Alf Joint as Big Man
Bill Reed as Huge Man

Production crew included:
Writer: Brian Clemens
Director: James Hill
Producer: Julian Wintle
Music: Laurie Johnson

Production

The Avengers was a British television series first broadcast in 1961. It was a spy series that, according to Phelim O'Neill in The Guardian, "transcended its humble, gritty beginnings to become a colourful, surreal flagship for almost everything fun and groovy about the swinging 60s". It was one of the first British programmes to achieve success in the United States. After the initial series, which featured Ian Hendry, the main characters were agents John Steed, played by Patrick Macnee, and Cathy Gale, portrayed by Honor Blackman. For the fourth series, in 1965, Diana Rigg as Emma Peel replaced Blackman. Production for the series began in May 1965, with a shooting schedule of ten days and a budget of £30,000 per episode, although many of the episodes ran over schedule, averaging 14 days to complete. Rigg and Macnee worked fourteen-hour days, and each had around 60 pages of dialogue to learn each week.

"A Touch of Brimstone" was filmed  December 1965, with a working title of "The Hellfire Club". It was written by Brian Clemens and directed by James Hill. The episode was first broadcast by Scottish Television on Tuesday 15 February 1966. ABC Weekend Television, who commissioned the show, broadcast it in its own regions four days later on Saturday 19 February, as the twenty-first episode of the fourth series. During Rigg's time on the show, each episode had a two-line subtitle after the main title. For "A Touch of Brimstone" the subtitle was "In which Steed Joins The Hellfire Club – And Emma Becomes the Queen of Sin". When broadcast in France, the episode was titled "Le Club de L'Enfer."

Reception and influence
The series received the highest UK viewing figures for any episode of The Avengers, attracting an estimated 8.4 million viewers, which made it the fifth most-viewed programme of that week. Michael Billington wrote in The Stage that the episode had "just the right mixture of extravagance and menace". He praised the lead actors, calling Macnee's playing of Steed "unimprovable", describing Wyngarde's part an "immaculate performance", and saying that although Rigg's portrayal of Emma Peel has received a mixed reception, he felt that she had "made a definable character out of Emma Peel, sometimes without much help from the scriptwriters".

The episode is known for the scene in which Peel dons a kinky "Queen of Sin" costume (which Rigg designed herself), complete with a dog collar with three-inch spikes, whalebone corset, and high leather boots. Rigg also carried a large snake. The members of the Hellfire Club have been described as engaging in "uninhibited debauchery". Towards the end of the episode, Cartney, wielding a whip, confronts Peel. Clemens recalled in 2000 that there had been "four or five" lashes of the whip in the final cut. The full scene was included on a 1993 video release from Lumiere Pictures, from James Chapman counted "up to 12 cracks" but noted that at no point was the whip seen to have made contact with Peel. Due to the content, the episode was not broadcast when The Avengers aired on American network television; it did air on British television, but with the whipping scene edited down to one crack of the whip in some ITV regions. The full scene was included on a 1993 video release from Lumiere Pictures.

Media historian James Chapman wrote of the episode, "With its visual references to sado-masochistic pornography", it was predictable that "A Touch of Brimstone" would experience censorship difficulties with the ITV network, and also not be broadcast in America. Chapman also considered that the episode highlighted inconsistencies in the way that women were portrayed in The Avengers, as although Peel is dressed as a dominatrix, Cartney tells his fellow club members to "do with her as you will" and she is taken away by them seemingly for their own agenda. Her escape is not shown, but she next appears fighting one opponent and then in the confrontation against Cartney, during which he attacks her with a whip. Chapman believes that Peel "is therefore made to play the roles of both dominatrix and victimised woman ... [she] embodies aspects of both dominant and passive femininity." Women's Studies scholar Sherrie A. Inness wrote that the episode provides an example of how The Avengers "emphasized women's sexuality ... [by having] Emma expose her curvaceous form". Inness describes the Queen of Sin outfit and argues that this emphasis on the character's sexuality "reduced her tough image and showed viewers that, despite her karate abilities, she was all woman." Considering the character of Peel in the series overall, Inness concludes that although the character, with her combat abilities, was an unusual depiction of women at the time, and appealed to female viewers, the character nevertheless "helped to reinforce stereotypes about women."

Tom Lisanti and Louis Paul, authors of Film Fatales: Women in Espionage Films and Television, 1962–1973 cited the episode as one of Diana Rigg's finest, and it was rated as one of the five best episodes of the fourth series by Paul Cornell, Martin Day and Keith Topping in The Avengers Dossier. The authors wrote that it was the zenith of the series, describing it as camp, "and with the magnificent OTT [over the top] grandeur of Wyngarde. One laughs at the sheer verve of it".

This episode was Chris Claremont's inspiration for the Hellfire Club in Marvel Comics' "X-Men", and in particular the story arc in Uncanny X-Men #132–134. Hellfire Club member Jason Wyngarde's name and likeness is based on Peter Wyngarde, who was later known for the role of Jason King. It was reported in 1993 that fans were still sending Rigg postcards of her dressed as the Queen of Sin to be autographed.

References

External links

Episode overview on The Avengers Forever! website

The Avengers (season 4) episodes
1966 British television episodes